The Taymyr was an icebreaking steamer of 1200 tons built for the Russian Imperial Navy at St. Petersburg in 1909. It was named after the Taymyr Peninsula.

Taymyr and her sister ship Vaygach were built for the purpose of thoroughly exploring the uncharted areas of the Northern Sea Route. This venture became known as the Arctic Ocean Hydrographic Expedition.

Surveys
The first of a series of surveys began in the autumn of 1910, when Taymyr and Vaygach left Vladivostok. They entered the Chukchi Sea with scientists on board and began their exploration. For the next five years, these icebreakers went on sounding and carrying on vital surveys during the thaw. Before every winter, when ice conditions became too bad, they returned to Vladivostok and waited for the spring. In 1911 the scientists and crew aboard Vaygach and Taymyr made the first Russian landing on Wrangel Island.

In 1914, Boris Vilkitsky was both the captain of Taymyr and the leader of the Arctic Ocean Hydrographic Expedition. The purpose of the icebreakers Taymyr and Vaygach was to force the whole Northern Passage in order to reach Archangelsk. Severe weather and ice conditions, however, didn't allow them to cross the Kara Sea and they were forced to winter at Bukhta Dika, close to the Firnley Islands. Thus the sister icebreakers were able to complete the passage only in 1915. They were warmly welcomed in Archangelsk upon their arrival.

Some of the biggest successes of the expedition were the accurate charting of the Northern Sea Route and the discovery of Severnaya Zemlya in 1913. Taymyr and Vaygach were considered the best icebreakers in the world at the time.

NP-1 operated for 9 months, during which the ice floe passed . On 19 February 1938, Soviet icebreaker Taimyr, along with Murman took off four polar explorers from the station, who immediately became famous in the USSR and were awarded titles Hero of the Soviet Union.

Nuclear vessels
A nuclear icebreaker of the Soviet Navy, as well as a class of nuclear-powered river icebreakers, was named Taymyr in 1988.

See also
 Russian Hydrographic Service

References

External links
 
 

Icebreakers of Russia
Icebreakers of the Soviet Union
Arctic exploration vessels
Chukchi Sea
Kara Sea